The tram route 39 in Brussels, Belgium is a tram route operated by the STIB/MIVB. It connects the Montgomery metro station in the municipality of Sint-Pieters-Woluwe/Woluwe-Saint-Pierre to the Ban Eik stop in the Flemish municipality of Wezembeek-Oppem. 

Starting from the underground terminus at the Montgomery metro station, the route exits the tunnel to run on the Avenue de Tervueren. The route there runs along the Woluwe park, Parmentier park and Mellaerts ponds, together with tram route 44. At the crossroad with Avenue Alfred Madoux/Alfred Madouxlaan, the route exits the Avenue de Tervueren and heads toward the Stockel/Stokkel metro station via the Avenue Orban/Orbanlaan. Past the Stockel metro station, the route runs on the Avenue de Hinnisdael/De Hinnisdaellaan and then turns right on a proper route, where it enters Flanders and the municipalities of Kraainem and Wezembeek-Oppem respectively. At some point, the tram route runs on a bridge over the Brussels Ring.

See also
List of Brussels tram routes

References

External links
STIB/MIVB official website

39
Kraainem
Wezembeek-Oppem
Woluwe-Saint-Pierre